Exequiel Bustillo (1893–1973) was an Argentine lawyer and politician. He was president of the Argentine National Park Service.

As director of the National Park Service he enjoyed great autonomy and set out to develop the national parks according to his vision. Several activities contrary to his vision were targeted. He over sighted the eviction of settlers living of husbandry many of whom were Chileans. Under his leadership logging activity was suppressed. Indigenous people living inside the national parks were however tolerated.  
   
In the position he commissioned his brother Alejandro Bustillo among others to design build-up the city of Bariloche as a centre for tourism. In his development plans Bustillo was inspired in Hubert Lyautey's administration of French Morocco.

References

1893 births
1973 deaths
20th-century Argentine lawyers
Argentine politicians